The Pont de Normandie is a cable-stayed road bridge that spans the river Seine linking Le Havre to Honfleur in Normandy, northern France. Its total length is  –  between the two piers. It is also the last bridge to cross the Seine before it empties into the ocean. It is a motorway toll bridge with a footpath and a narrow cycle lane in each direction allowing pedestrians and cyclists to cross the bridge free of charge, while motorcycling is also toll-free.

Construction
The bridge was designed by Michel Virlogeux, the general studies having been led by Bernard Raspaud from Bouygues. The works management was shared between G. Barlet and P. Jacquet. The architects were François Doyelle and Charles Lavigne. Construction by Bouygues, Campenon Bernard, Dumez, Monberg & Thorsen, Quillery, Sogea and Spie Batignolles began in 1988 and lasted seven years. The bridge opened on 20 January 1995.

At the time it was both the longest cable-stayed bridge in the world, and also had a record distance between piers for a cable-stayed bridge. It was more than  longer between piers than the previous record-holder. This record was lost in 1999 to the Tatara Bridge in Japan. Its record for length for a cable-stayed bridge was lost in 2004 to the 2883 meters of the Rio-Antirrio. The total cost of the bridge, ancillary structures and financing was $465 million. The bridge proper cost €233 million (US$250 million).

The cable-stayed design was chosen because it was both cheaper and more resistant to high winds than a suspension bridge. Shortly after opening, the longest cables exhibited excessive vibrations, so several damping systems were quickly retrofitted.

Structure 
The pylons, made of concrete, are shaped as upside-down Ys.

Gallery

See also
 List of bridges in France
 List of crossings of the River Seine
 List of longest cable-stayed bridge spans
 List of tallest bridges in the world

References

External links

 Website of Pont de Normandie and Pont de Tancarville 
 Website of the company operating the bridge 

Bridges over the River Seine
Cable-stayed bridges in France
Bridges completed in 1995
Pont de Normandie
Pont de Normandie
Pont de Normandie
Pont de Normandie
Toll bridges in France